Krista Posch (10 January 1948 in Bolzano, Italy) is an Italian-German television actress.

Awards
 1983: Förderpreis für Literatur der Landeshauptstadt Düsseldorf in Northrhine-Westphalia

External links 
 
 Personal Site 
 Agency Vogel

References 

German television actresses
Italian television actresses
German people of Italian descent
Actors from Bolzano
1948 births
Living people
20th-century German actresses
20th-century Italian actresses
21st-century German actresses
21st-century Italian actresses
Germanophone Italian people